Matthew Boyle is an American philosopher, and Emerson and Grace Wineland Pugh Professor of Humanities at The University of Chicago. He is known for his works on the philosophy of mind and on some issues in the history of philosophy.

Books
 Additive Theories of Rationality: A Critique
 Essentially Rational Animals

References

External links

Living people
21st-century American philosophers
University of Chicago faculty
Philosophers of mind
University of Pittsburgh alumni
Alumni of the University of Oxford
Historians of philosophy
Year of birth missing (living people)